So Happy is the second music album by American comedian and singer Eddie Murphy, released in August 1989 by Columbia Records. A funk and soul effort with often humorous sexual lyrics, it was co-written and co-produced by Murphy with several high-profile contemporary musicians, such as Nile Rodgers and Larry Blackmon, at various recording studios in California, New York, Florida, and the Bahamas. The album was not a commercial success and received mixed reviews.

Release 
So Happy was released by Columbia Records in August 1989 and failed to significantly impact the pop record charts. It reached number 70 on Billboard magazine's Top Pop Albums and number 22 on the Top Black Albums chart. The pop-funk song "Put Your Mouth on Me" was released as the album's lead single, performing well on both Billboards pop and black singles charts.

Critical reception 

Reviewing So Happy in August 1989, Chicago Tribune journalist Chris Heim viewed it as an improvement over Murphy's first album, saying that the comedian "seems more comfortable in the role of vocalist this time". Similarly, The Village Voice critic Robert Christgau observed a greater seriousness in Murphy's "wheedling croon" that is ideal for the album's cartoonish style of funk and "wicked Prince rip". While questioning the depth behind the sexual desires in Murphy's lyrics, Christgau highlighted the singer's humor on songs such as "Love Moans": "He's big on locations, spends an entire song convincing her to do it in a chair. Inspirational Dialogue: She: 'Are you close?' He: 'If I get any closer I be behind you.'"

Don Waller was more critical in his review for the Los Angeles Times. He applauded the sexual conceit of "Put Your Mouth on Me" and the compelling musical qualities in "Bubble Hill" and the title track, but found rest of the album derivative and Murphy merely "better than your average shower singer". In Mark Coleman and J. D. Considine's entry on Murphy in The Rolling Stone Album Guide (1992), the comedian is criticized for not only lacking "the equipment to carry off his soul-star ambitions", but seeming "genuinely uncomfortable trying to deliver any but the most basic emotions" and resorting to an emphasis on "musical jokes" that "wears thin throughout So Happy".

Track listing

Personnel 
Information is taken from AllMusic.

Musicians
Walter Afanasieff, David Allen Jones, Carmen Rizzo, Narada Michael Walden – drums
Gigi Gonaway, Bongo Bob – percussion
Lanar Brantley, Randy Jackson – bass
Walter Afanasieff – synthesized bass
Walter Afanasieff, John Barnes, Eric Daniels, Merv De Peyer, David Allen Jones, Kevin Kendricks, Eddie Murphy, Aaron Zigman – keyboards
Vernon "Ice" Black, Johnny Gill, Paul Pesco, Dick Smith, Charlie Singleton, Marty Walsh – guitar
Chip McNeill – saxophone
Claytoven Richardson, Randy Jackson, Skyler Jett, Alfa Anderson, Briz, Christopher Max, Nile Rodgers, Audrey Wheeler, Cindy Mizelle, David Allen Jones, Dick Smith, Stacy McDonald, Larry Blackmon, Tomi Jenkins – backing vocals

Production
Produced by Walter Afanasieff, David Allen Jones, Carmen Rizzo, Eddie Murphy, Nile Rodgers and Narada Michael Walden
Engineers: John Barnes, Knut Bohn, Dana Jon Chapelle, David Frazer, Daniel Lazerus, Jay Mark, Barney Perkins, Carmen Rizzo, Brad Sundberg, Ralph Sutton
Assistant and Second Engineers: Paul Angelli, Ed Brooks, Dana Jon Chapelle, Mark Herman, Mike Strick
Mixing: John Barnes, David Frazer, Barney Perkins, David Rideau
Cecil Holmes – executive producer
Tony Sellari – art direction
Bonnie Schiffman – photography

Charts

References

External links 
 

1989 albums
Eddie Murphy albums
CBS Records albums
Albums produced by Walter Afanasieff
Albums produced by Nile Rodgers
Albums produced by Narada Michael Walden
Pop albums by American artists